Avonia is an unincorporated community and census-designated place (CDP) in Erie County, Pennsylvania, United States. The population was 1,205 at the 2010 census, down from 1,331 in 2000. It is part of the Erie Metropolitan Statistical Area.

Geography
Avonia is located in west-central Erie County at  (42.051197, -80.270399), in the northwestern part of Fairview Township. It is bordered to the north by Lake Erie, to the west by Girard Township, and to the south by the Fairview CDP. Pennsylvania Route 5 (West Lake Road) passes through the community, leading northeast  to downtown Erie and southwest  to Lake City.

Demographics

As of the census of 2000, there were 1,331 people, 497 households, and 389 families residing in the community. The population density was 509.0 people per square mile (196.9/km). There were 540 housing units at an average density of 206.5/sq mi (79.9/km). The racial makeup of the community was 98.57% White, 0.23% African American, 0.60% Asian, 0.08% from other races, and 0.53% from two or more races. Hispanic or Latino of any race were 0.38% of the population.

There were 497 households, out of which 34.2% had children under the age of 18 living with them, 70.6% were married couples living together, 5.6% had a female householder with no husband present, and 21.7% were non-families. 16.7% of all households were made up of individuals, and 5.2% had someone living alone who was 65 years of age or older. The average household size was 2.68 and the average family size was 3.05.

The population was spread out, with 25.4% under the age of 18, 5.9% from 18 to 24, 25.3% from 25 to 44, 32.1% from 45 to 64, and 11.3% who were 65 years of age or older. The median age was 42 years. For every 100 females, there were 102.6 males. For every 100 females age 18 and over, there were 98.2 males.

The median income for a household in Avonia was $54,821, and the median income for a family was $60,865. Males had a median income of $41,779 versus $35,069 for females. The per capita income for the community was $25,709. About 1.7% of families and 2.0% of the population were below the poverty line, including 3.5% of those under age 18 and none of those age 65 or over.

References

Census-designated places in Erie County, Pennsylvania
Census-designated places in Pennsylvania